Craig Watson (born 6 August 1976 in Sydney, New South Wales) is an Australian motorcycle speedway rider who rode for the Newport Wasps, Poole Pirates, Belle Vue Aces, Glasgow Tigers and Birmingham Brummies in the Elite League. Watson was the winner of the 1996 NSW State Championship. He is also a triple Australian Longtrack Champion, having won the championship in 1997, 1998 and 2002.

Career
Watson spent most of his career with the Newport Wasps. He failed to agree terms with the Newport promotion for 2007 and was eventually signed up by former club Poole Pirates in the Elite League. However his scores were low and when he suffered an injury early in the season his replacement, Piotr Swist, did well enough to keep his place. Watson signed for Premier League team the Glasgow Tigers for the rest of the 2007 season and had a successful spell with the club.  

At the start of 2008, Watson was again signed by his parent club the Poole Pirates to ride for them at reserve. However, the BSPA found that his greensheet average was incorrect and therefore his average would be too high for him to fit into the Poole squad. Watson was left without a club, but soon after once again signed for Premier League team Newport. Newport closed in May following the death of their owner, and Watson joined the Birmingham Brummies.

References 

1976 births
Living people
Australian speedway riders
Motorcycle racers from Sydney
Poole Pirates riders
Glasgow Tigers riders
Newport Wasps riders
Birmingham Brummies riders